Neritopsoidea is a taxonomic grouping, a superfamily of sea snails, marine gastropod mollusks in the clade Cycloneritimorpha, within the clade Neritimorpha, (according to Bouchet & Rocroi, 2005), or in the order Neritoina within superorder Cycloneritimorpha within the subclass Neritimorpha, (according to Bandel, 2007).

Taxonomy

1997 taxonomy 
Neritopsoidea was placed in the order Neritoida, the superorder Neritopsina and the subclass Orthogastropoda according to the taxonomy of the Gastropoda by Ponder & Lindberg, 1997.

2005 taxonomy 
This family consists of the following six families (according to the taxonomy of the Gastropoda by Bouchet & Rocroi, 2005):

 family Neritopsidae
 † family Cortinellidae
 † family Delphinulopsidae
 † family Plagiothyridae
 † family Pseudorthonychiidae
 family Titiscaniidae

2007 taxonomy 
Bandel (2007) described four new families in the Neritopsoidea:

Superfamily Neritopsoidea
 family Neritopsidae
 † Fedaiellidae Bandel, 2007
 † family Delphinulopsidae
 † family Cortinellidae
 † Palaeonaricidae Bandel, 2007
 † Naticopsidae - Bandel (2007) recognizes Natisopsinae (in Neritopsidae by Bouchet & Rocrois 2005) at family level.
 † Tricolnaticopsidae Bandel, 2007
 † Scalaneritinidae Bandel, 2007
 † family Plagiothyridae
 † family Pseudorthonychiidae
 family Titiscaniidae

References

Marine gastropods
Gastropod superfamilies
Taxa named by John Edward Gray